Robert Jonathan Mosebach (born September 14, 1984) is a Major League Baseball relief pitcher who is currently a free agent.

Mosebach made his major league debut against the Minnesota Twins on July 25, at Angel Stadium of Anaheim, pitching one inning and giving up two hits. However, he was optioned to the Triple-A Salt Lake Bees just five days later. He elected for free agency at the end of the 2010 season.

On March 2, 2016, Mosebach signed with the Wichita Wingnuts of the American Association of Independent Professional Baseball.

References

External links 

1984 births
Living people
Major League Baseball pitchers
Baseball players from Florida
Arizona League Angels players
Orem Owlz players
Cedar Rapids Kernels players
Rancho Cucamonga Quakes players
Hillsborough Hawks baseball players
Arkansas Travelers players
Salt Lake Bees players
Los Angeles Angels players
Sportspeople from West Palm Beach, Florida
Toros del Este players
American expatriate baseball players in the Dominican Republic
Wichita Wingnuts players
Scottsdale Scorpions players